Lexington Township is one of the seventeen townships of Stark County, Ohio, United States.  The 2000 census found 5,583 people in the township, 5,390 of whom lived in the unincorporated portions of the township.

Geography
Located in the northeastern corner of the county, it borders the following townships and city:
Atwater Township, Portage County - north
Deerfield Township, Portage County - northeast
Smith Township, Mahoning County - east
Alliance - southeast
Washington Township - south
Marlboro Township - west

It is the only township in the county with a border on Mahoning County.

The city of Alliance is in the southeast. The unincorporated community of Limaville, a census-designated place (CDP), is in the north, and the CDP of Bolton is in the center of the township.

Name and history
It is the only Lexington Township statewide.

In 1833, Lexington Township contained three gristmills, seven saw mills, one tannery, and four stores.

Government

The township is governed by a three-member board of trustees, who are elected in November of odd-numbered years to a four-year term beginning on the following January 1. Two are elected in the year after the presidential election and one is elected in the year before it. There is also an elected township fiscal officer, who serves a four-year term beginning on April 1 of the year after the election, which is held in November of the year before the presidential election. Vacancies in the fiscal officership or on the board of trustees are filled by the remaining trustees.

References

External links

Townships in Stark County, Ohio
Townships in Ohio